Minzu can refer to:

Ethnic minorities in China (Chinese: shǎoshù mínzú)
See also: List of ethnic groups in China
Minzu University of China
Minzu railway station (Inner Mongolia), on the Beijing–Baotou railway
Minzu railway station (Taiwan), on the Pingtung line in Kaohsiung
Minzu Township in Li County, Gansu, in China